North Jay is an unincorporated village in the town of Jay, Franklin County, Maine, United States.

References

Villages in Franklin County, Maine
Villages in Maine